Oscar García (born 13 September 1941) is a former Argentine cyclist. He competed in the sprint at the 1964 Summer Olympics.

References

External links
 

1941 births
Living people
Argentine male cyclists
Olympic cyclists of Argentina
Cyclists at the 1964 Summer Olympics
Place of birth missing (living people)
Pan American Games medalists in cycling
Pan American Games silver medalists for Argentina
Cyclists at the 1967 Pan American Games
Medalists at the 1967 Pan American Games
20th-century Argentine people